Harji is a village in Ahore tehsil of Jalore District of Rajasthan state in India. It is situated on the road from Sirohi to Jalore.

Villages in Jalore district

The land of "JALORIAN".